Lady Nairne may refer to:

Carolina, Baroness Nairne (1766–1845), songwriter
Margaret Mercer Elphinstone (1788–1867), Scottish society hostess
Emily Petty-Fitzmaurice, Marchioness of Lansdowne, the 8th Lady Nairne